The 2019 RAN Women's Sevens was the 15th edition of the annual rugby sevens tournament organized by Rugby Americas North. It was played at the Truman Bodden Sports Complex in George Town, Cayman Islands. Six national teams played a round robin. With Canada and the United States already eligible for the 2020 Summer Olympics by way of the 2018–19 World Rugby Women's Sevens Series, the top two finishing teams of the tournament are eligible for a 2020 repechage tournament.

Teams
The following six teams participated:

Pool stage
All times in Eastern Standard Time (UTC−05:00)

Placement stage

5th place

3rd place

Final

Standings

References

Rugby sevens at the 2020 Summer Olympics – Women's qualification
2019
2019 in women's rugby union
2019 rugby sevens competitions
2019 in North American rugby union
rugby union
rugby union
July 2019 sports events in North America